Sarwa language may refer to:

Tshwa language (Sesarwa, Botswana)
Sarua language (Chad)

See also
Sharwa language